Margareta "Maggie" Kozuch (born 30 October 1986) is a German female volleyball player who played for Atom Trefl Sopot, and previously played as a wing-spiker for TuS Berne Hamburg, CVMJ Hamburg, TV Fischbek (who changed their name to NA Hamburg), and Unicom Starker Kerakoll Sassuolo. 

She was Hamburg's sportswoman of the year in 2005. She represented the German women's national volleyball team in the FIVB World Grand Prix 2009. 

She was German sportswoman of the year in 2010. She is of Polish origin.

Beach Volleyball
After a successful career playing indoor volleyball, Kozuch switched to beach volleyball in 2017. She teamed up with Olympics veteran, Laura Ludwig, winning the World Tour Finals in 2019. 

In 2021, Ludwig and Kozuch represented Germany at the 2020 Summer Olympics in Tokyo that had been delayed due to the worldwide Covid-19 pandemic. The pair reached the quarter finals losing to the Americans April Ross and Alix Klineman.

Clubs
  TuS Berne (1999–2002)
  CVJM Hamburg (2002–2003)
  TV Fischbek Hamburg (2003–2006)
  NA Hamburg (2006–2007)
  Unicom Starker Kerakoll Sassuolo (2007–2008)
  Asystel Volley Novara (2008–2010)
  Zarechie Odintsovo (2010–2011)
  Atom Trefl Sopot (2011–2012)
  Yamamay Busto Arsizio (2012–2013)
  Azerrail Baku (2013–2014)
  Shanghai (2014–2015)
  Pomi Casalmaggiore (2015–2016)

Awards

Individuals
 2009 European Championships "Best Scorer"
 2010 German Volleyball Player of the Year
 2011 European Championship "Best Spiker"
 2011 German Volleyball Player of the Year
 2012 German Volleyball Player of the Year
 2013 Women's European Volleyball League "Best Spiker"
 2013 Women's European Volleyball League "Best Scorer"
 2013 German Volleyball Player of the Year
 2014 German Volleyball Player of the Year

Clubs
 2009 CEV Cup –  Champion, with Asystel Volley Novara
 2012–13 CEV Champions League –  Bronze medal, with Yamamay Busto Arsizio
 2015-16 CEV Champions League -  Gold medal, with Pomi Casalmaggiore

References

External links
 
 
 
 
 
 
 FIVB Profile
 Italian League Profile
 

1986 births
Living people
German women's volleyball players
German people of Polish descent
Sportspeople from Hamburg
European Games competitors for Germany
Volleyball players at the 2015 European Games
Olympic beach volleyball players of Germany
Beach volleyball players at the 2020 Summer Olympics
21st-century German women
20th-century German women